The 2016–17 Conference USA men's basketball season began with practices in October 2016, followed by the start of the 2016–17 NCAA Division I men's basketball season in November. Conference play began in late December and concluded in early March.

Middle Tennessee claimed the outright regular season championship with a win over UAB on February 26, 2017. Louisiana Tech finished in second place in the regular season, three games behind the Blue Raiders.

Middle Tennessee's JaCorey Williams was named C-USA Player of the Year and Kermit Davis was named the Coach of the Year.

The C-USA tournament was held from March 8 through 11, 2017 at Legacy Arena in Birmingham, Alabama. Middle Tennessee defeated Marshall to win the tournament championship for the second consecutive year. As a result, the Blue Raiders received the conference's automatic bid to the NCAA tournament. No other C-USA school received an NCAA Tournament bid. Rice received a bid to the College Basketball Invitational tournament.

Head coaches

Coaching changes 
On March 10, 2016, after 10 years with UTSA, head coach Brooks Thompson was fired. He finished at UTSA with a record of 130–176. On April 1, the school hired Steve Henson as head coach.

On March 17, 2016, WKU head coach Ray Harper resigned after three players were suspended by a university disciplinary committee. He finished at WKU with a record of 90–62. On March 28, the school hired Rick Stansbury as head coach.

UAB head coach Jerod Haase left UAB to accept the head coaching position at Stanford. On April 4, 2016, the school hired Robert Ehsan, who had been an assistant under Haase at UAB, as head coach .

Coaches 

Notes: 
 All records, appearances, titles, etc. are from time with current school only. 
 Year at school includes 2016–17 season.
 Overall and C-USA records are from time at current school and are through the end of the 2016–17 season.

Preseason

Preseason Coaches Poll
Source

() first place votes

Preseason All-C-USA Team
Source

Conference schedules

Conference matrix
This table summarizes the head-to-head results between teams in conference play.

Players of the Week
Throughout the conference regular season, the C-USA offices named one or two players of the week and one or two freshmen of the week each Monday.

All-C-USA honors and awards
Following the regular season, the conference selected outstanding performers based on a poll of league coaches.

Postseason

C-USA Tournament 

Only the top 12 conference teams were eligible for the tournament.

NCAA tournament

References